Herbaspirillum rubrisubalbicans is a nitrogen-fixing bacterium of the genus Herbaspirillum found in roots and stems of sugarcane (Saccharum officinarum), sorghum (Sorghum bicolor), and rice (Oryza sativa). H. rubrisubalbicans can cause symptoms of the mottled stripe disease in sugarcane and sorghum. Leaves inoculated with H. rubrisubalbicans show red stripes along the secondary veins of the leaf blade.

References

External links
Type strain of Herbaspirillum rubrisubalbicans at BacDive -  the Bacterial Diversity Metadatabase

Burkholderiales
Sugarcane diseases
Bacteria described in 1996